The 2001 season of the Montserrat Championship was the sixth recorded season of top flight association football competition in Montserrat, with records for any competition held between 1975 and 1995 not available, and the second iteration of the championship since the 1996–97 season was abandoned when the Soufrière Hills erupted causing widespread devastation to the island. The championship was won by the Royal Montserrat Police Force, their fourth title out of the five completed seasons to date.

League table

Top scorers

Awards
At the prize-giving ceremony, five prizes were awarded as follows:

 League Winners: Police
 Most Improved Team: MSS
 Most Disciplined Team: Police
 Fair Play: Ideal
 Most Improved Player: Kelvin Ponde

References

2001 domestic association football leagues
2001 in Montserrat
Montserrat Championship seasons